Peter La Touche (c. 1775 – 11 February 1830) was a landowner and Irish politician.

The La Touche family were Huguenots originally from France and settled in Ireland after the revocation of the Edict of Nantes which deprived the French Protestants of all religious and civil liberties, leading to largescale emigration.

He was the son of David La Touche MP, of Marlay, County Dublin and educated at Harrow School (1786–1791) and Trinity College, Dublin He succeeded his uncle Peter Latouche, MP, to Bellevue House, County Wicklow in 1828.

He became a Member of Parliament for County Leitrim 1802–1806.

He married the Hon. Charlotte Maude, daughter of Cornwallis, 1st Viscount Hawarden, with whom he had nine sons and five daughters. He was succeeded in turn by his sons Peter David and William Robert.

Peter and his brother John were governors of the Female Orphanage Kirwan House on Dublin's North Circular Road.

References 
  
 
 

1770s births
1830 deaths
People educated at Harrow School
Alumni of Trinity College Dublin
Members of the Parliament of the United Kingdom for County Leitrim constituencies (1801–1922)
UK MPs 1802–1806
People from County Wicklow